Martino Ferabosco was an Italian engraver who lived in Rome, and engraved the plates for the work Architettura della Basilica di San Pietro in Vaticano (Architecture of St. Peter's Basilica in the Vatican) published in Rome in 1620.

References

Italian engravers
Architects from Rome
17th-century Italian architects